The Morogoro pretty grasshopper (Acanthothericles bicoloripes) is a species of thericleid orthopteran that is endemic to lowland and submontane rainforests around Morogoro in Tanzania. It has not been recorded since 1939, and is possibly extinct. If it is still extant, it is threatened by deforestation and conversion to agricultural land.

References

Caelifera

Critically endangered insects
Endemic fauna of Tanzania
Insects described in 1977